Winter's Gate is the seventh studio album by the Finnish melodic death metal band Insomnium. It was released worldwide on September 23, 2016 via Century Media Records. It is a concept album said to be about “a group of Vikings who set out to find a fabled island west of Ireland, despite the treacherous winter drawing near.”

The album consists of a single 40-minute track. For streaming and download services, it was split into seven separate tracks despite containing six movements denoted in the lyrics. These movements are noted in the tracklist below. For vinyl, the song was split across sides between parts 3 and 4.

Track listing

Credits 
Credits are adapted from the album liner notes.

Insomnium
 Niilo Sevänen – lead vocals, bass
 Ville Friman – guitars, clean vocals
 Markus Vanhala – guitars
 Markus Hirvonen – drums

Additional musicians
 Teemu Aalto – backing vocals

Arrangements and compositions
 Insomnium – arrangements
 Teemu Aalto – arrangements
 Aleksi Munter – keyboard composition, keyboard arrangements
 Ville Friman – keyboard composition
 Markus Vanhala – keyboard composition
 Niilo Sevänen – keyboard composition

 
Production and artwork
 Insomnium – production
 Teemu Aalto – production, recording (guitar, bass, vocals)
 Kimmo Perkkiö – recording (drums)
 Hannu Honkonen – recording (keyboard)
 Aleksi Munter – recording (keyboard)
 Dan Swanö – mixing, mastering
 Teemu Tähkänen – artwork
 Jussi Ratilainen – photography
 Nora Dirkling – layout
 Tuomas Puumalainen – translation

 
Studios
 SF Sound Studio – recording (drums)
 Scoring Helsinki – recording (keyboard)
 Studio Korkeakoski – recording (guitar, bass, vocals)
 Unisound – mixing, mastering

Charts

References

External links 
 
 Winter's Gate at Century Media Records

2016 albums
Century Media Records albums
Insomnium albums